Hong Kong Chinese Women's Club College is located in Sai Wan Ho in Hong Kong. It was founded on 1 September 1978 and Mr. Yeung Chi Keung is the principal. The school uses English as the Medium of Instruction; it is an aided grammar school in Band 1 while the school motto is "Knowledge and Perseverance".

School facilities
25 Classrooms
4 laboratories
Biology laboratory
Chemistry laboratory
Physics laboratory
Integrated science laboratory 
Hall 
2 Playgrounds
Cover Playground
Boys changing Room
Girls Changing Room
CALC
Student Activity Centre, SAC
2 Staff Rooms
Geography Room
Music Room
Computer Room (classroom For S.6A)
Art Room
Needlework Room (classroom For S.6C)
Home Economics Room
Design and Technology Room
Library
G01
Principal Room
Student Association Room
Medical Room
Conference Room
Discipline Room
Tuck Shop

House
 There are four houses in this school which include Ruby, Topaz, Sapphire and Emerald.
 Students are divided into these 4 houses in F.1.

Alumni
Choi Yat-Git: A member of the famous Hong Kong band- Grasshopper
Yan Chi Hong (Jim): A famous DJ in the Commercial Radio Hong Kong
Chan Ka Kin: The winner of the first prize in the environmental management studies of 58th Intel International Science and Engineering Fair.
Wing Shya: a famous photographer
Holden Chow Ho-ding: The vice-chairperson of the Democratic Alliance for the Betterment and Progress of Hong Kong
Yang Sze Ngai (Raymond): Co-Founder of "JUST FEEL", a charitable organization promoting socio-emotional education

Neighborhood 

 Sai Wan Ho Fire Station
 Shau Kei Wan Police Station

Secondary schools in Hong Kong
Sai Wan Ho